Wŏnsan, previously known as Wŏnsanjin, Port Lazarev, and Genzan, is a port city and naval base located in Kangwŏn Province, North Korea, along the eastern side of the Korean Peninsula, on the Sea of Japan and the provincial capital. The port was opened by occupying Japanese forces in 1880. Before 19501953 Korean War, it fell within the jurisdiction of the then South Hamgyŏng province, and during the war, it was the location of the Blockade of Wŏnsan. The population of the city was estimated at 329,207 in 2013. Notable people from Wŏnsan include Kim Ki-nam, a diplomat and former Vice Chairman of the ruling Workers' Party of Korea.

In 2013, it was announced that Wŏnsan would be converted into a summer destination with resorts and entertainment. Having spent his childhood years there, Kim Jong-un has expressed significant interest in further developing the region, with the construction of new infrastructure such as Kalma Airport, a dual-use civilian international airport and military proving ground. A state corporation, the Wonsan Zone Development Corporation, has been established with feasibility studies for a wide variety of hotels and commercial and industrial development.

Name

Wonsan has also been known as Yonghunghang, Yuan shan in China, Genzan or Gensan in Japan, and Port Lazareva or Port Lazareff in Russia.

Geography
It is located in Kangwŏn Province, on the westernmost part of the Sea of Japan (East Sea of Korea) and the east end of the Korean peninsula's neck. Mt. Changdok (Changdok-san) and Mt. Nap'al (Nap'al-san) are located to the west of the city. More than 20 small islands flank Wŏnsan's immediate coastal area, including Hwangt'o Island and Ryŏ Island. Wŏnsan is considered an excellent natural port location. Mount Kŭmgang is located near Wŏnsan.

Administrative divisions
Wŏnsan serves as the administrative center of Kangwŏn Province.

The City of Wŏnsan (Wŏnsan-si) is divided into 45 tong (neighborhoods) and 14 ri (villages):

 Changchon-dong
 Changdŏk-dong
 Changsan-dong
 Chŏkchŏn-dong
 Chŏnjin-dong
 Chungchŏng-dong
 Haean-dong
 Haebang 1-dong
 Haebang 2-dong
 Kaesŏn-dong
 Kalma-dong
 Kwangsŏk-dong
 Kwanphung-dong
 Myŏngsasimri-dong
 Myŏngsŏk-dong
 Naewŏnsan-dong
 Namsan-dong
 Panghasan-dong
 Pogmak-dong
 Poha-dong
 Pongchun-dong
 Pongsu-dong
 Phyŏnghwa-dong
 Ryŏdo-dong
 Ryongha-dong
 Ryul-dong
 Sambong-dong
 Sang-dong
 Segil-dong
 Sinhŭng-dong
 Sinphung-dong
 Sinsŏng-dong
 Sŏgu-dong
 Sŏkhyŏn-dong
 Songchŏn-dong
 Songhŭng-dong
 Sŭngri-dong
 Tŏksŏng-dong
 Tongmyŏngsan-dong
 Thap-dong
 Wau-dong
 Wŏnnam 1-dong
 Wŏnnam 2-dong
 Wŏnsŏk-dong
 Yangji-dong
 Changrim-ri
 Chuksal-li
 Chungp'yŏng-ri
 Chilbong-ri
 Chunsan-ri
 Hyŏndong-ri
 Namchŏn-ri
 Raksu-ri
 Ryongchŏn-ri
 Samthae-ri
 Sangja-ri
 Sinsŏng-ri
 Susang-ri
 Yŏngsam-ri

Climate
The city has a humid continental climate (Köppen Dwa).

History

Ancient history
Evidence of humans living in the area during the Neolithic period and Bronze age was found in the Chungpyongdong (Now promoted to ri) area, where pottery was found. The area was called Eo eul mae (於乙買) and Chonjung county (泉井郡), when it was under the rule of Goguryeo, and became Jungchon county (井泉郡) after it incorporated into the kingdom of Silla in 681. After Taejo of Goryeo conquered the region, the region was renamed as yongju (湧州) where it was ruled by a special defense administrator. The area was renamed again as Uiju (宜州), and a fortress was constructed in 1108. From 1258 to 1356, it was part of the Ssangseong Prefectures.

Modern history
Wŏnsan opened as a trade port in 1880. Its original name was Wŏnsanjin (元山津), but it was also known by the Russian name of Port Lazarev (Lazaref). Under Japanese rule (1910–45) it was called Gensan (元山). In 1914 the P'yŏngwŏn and Kyŏngwŏn railway lines were opened, connecting the city to P'yŏngyang (then known as Heijo) and Seoul (then Keijo or Kyŏngsŏng). Thus, the city gradually developed into an eastern product distribution center. Under the Japanese occupation, the city was heavily industrialized and served as an important point in the distribution of trade between Korea and mainland Japan.

After the Korean War broke out it was captured by American and South Korean troops on 10 October 1950 during their drive north. When they left ahead of the Chinese counter-attack, the city fell under Chinese control on 9 December 1950. It was heavily bombed and shelled by the United Nations in the Blockade of Wonsan during the Korean War. According to the official US Navy history, Wŏnsan was under continuous siege and bombardment by the American navy from March 1951 until July 27, 1953, making it the longest siege in modern American naval history. By the war's end, the city was a vast shell.

City centre redevelopment

Kim Jong-un announced in 2015 plans for a $582 million redevelopment of the city center, which is to be entirely demolished and rebuilt. A 5-star hotel, a 17-story Wonsan International Finance Centre, and a $9.6m exhibition hall are expected to be built.

Kim Jong Un maintains a private compound in Wonsan that includes a palace with several guest houses, a harbor with a boathouse, a beach, and a racehorse track.

Provincial borders
Wŏnsan used to be in South Hamgyŏng, but when provincial borders were redrawn in 1946, it joined the northern half of Kangwŏn (which had been split at the 38th parallel north into a zone under Soviet control in the north and one of American control in the south in 1945) and became its capital, as Kangwŏn's traditional capitals Wŏnju (1395–1895) and Ch'unch'ŏn (since 1896) both were south of the 38th parallel and south of the Military Demarcation Line that replaced the 38th parallel as a border in 1953.

Economy 
Wŏnsan has an aquatic product processing factory, shipyard, chemistry enterprise, a cement factory, as well as the 4 June Rolling Stock Works, which is one of the DPRK's largest railway rolling stock factories.

Transportation

Road and rail
The district of Wŏnsan-si is served by several stations on the Kangwŏn Line of the Korean State Railway, including a branch to the port; it is also connected to the national road network, and is the terminus of the P'yŏngyang-Wŏnsan Tourist Motorway and the Wŏnsan-Kŭmgangsan Highway.

Urban transit
A trolleybus system with two lines is currently in operation in Wonsan. The system opened on September 8, 1988, from Wonsan station to Changchon-dong. In 2020, there were three new trolleybus lines under construction in the city, which is aimed at reducing the number of fossil fuel-powered vehicles and to prevent air pollution, and a covered depot was opened. Prior to that, the vehicles were parked on the western loop. Services were often interrupted during this time. The new lines were planned to run from Changchon-dong to Kalma station, to Songdowon and to Myongsasimiri-dong. NK News however, incorrectly reported by implying that it was only being revived recently, while in fact, new Chollima-321 trolleybuses had been delivered since 2019. In 2020, the extension from Changchon-dong to Kalma station was completed, while in 2021, a fully new line was opened, and trolleybuses started to run to Songdowon, from Changchon-dong.

A tram line is also under construction, with the trams to be built by the Kim Chong-t'ae Electric Locomotive Works. The trams will be narrow gauge vehicles. This was after Kim Jong-un stressed the need for a tram line at the resort area. The line was completed on November 24, 2020, though passenger service has not started due to the incomplete state of the rest of the resort.

Air
The city has the dual purpose military and civilian Wŏnsan Airport (IATA: WON) equipped with 01/19 and 15/33 dual runways. Images from Google Earth from July and August 2014 indicated that major expansion was taking place, including the construction of two new runways. There is also an underground air force runway which runs through a mountain, near Wonsan. North Korea's first public air show, the Wonsan International Friendship Air Festival, was held at Wonsan Airport in September 2016.

Sea
Wŏnsan was also the terminus of the Mangyongbong-92 ferry that operated between Wŏnsan and Niigata, which was the only direct connection between Japan and North Korea. This service was canceled in 2006 when Japan banned North Korean ships.

Media 
The Korean Central Broadcasting Station maintains a 250-kilowatt mediumwave transmitter broadcasting on 882 kHz AM.

Education 
Wŏnsan is home to Songdowŏn University, Kŭmgang University, Tonghae University, the Jong Jun Thaek University of Economics, Wŏnsan University of Medicine, the Jo Gun Sil University of Engineering, Wŏnsan First University of Education, Ri Su Dok University, and the Maritime Patrol Academy, the commissioned officer's training school of the Korean People's Navy.

Sports 
The city is home to Unp'asan Sports Club, an association football club that plays in the DPR Korea First Class Sports Group, North Korea's premier league.

Tourism

Wonsan has long been a popular tourism destination for both Koreans and international visitors.  Attractions include Songdowon beach, the site of the Songdowon International Children's Union Camp, which maintains exceptionally clear and clean water. Pine trees are abundant in the surrounding area, and it has been designated a national sightseeing point. The nearby Kalma Peninsula is to feature a new hotel and a bathing area.

Wonsan Special Tourist Zone

Announced in 2014, the Wonsan Special Tourist Zone is to cover more than 400 square km and boasts 40 historical relics, 10 sand beaches, 680 tourist attractions, four mineral springs, and several bathing resorts and natural lakes. As part of this development, the Masikryong Ski Resort was built in 2016. A $123m golf course is planned outside the city.

Famous scenic sites near Wŏnsan include Myŏngsasimri, Lake Sijung, Chongsokchon and Mt. Kŭmgang. Temples in the area include the Sogwangsa and Anbyon Pohyonsa Buddhist temples. The German Church is the former church of the Tŏkwŏn abbey, now used by the Wŏnsan University of Agriculture.

Sister cities
  Sakaiminato, Tottori, Japan (1992–2006)
  Puebla, Mexico
  Vladivostok, Russia

See also

 List of East Asian ports
 Geography of North Korea
 Naval bases of the Korean People's Navy

References

Further reading
Dormels, Rainer. North Korea's Cities: Industrial facilities, internal structures, and typification. Jimoondang, 2014. 
Introduction to Investment Projects in Wonsan-Mt. Kumgang International Tourist Zone, Wonsan Zone Development Corporation. Pyongyang, 2016.

External links

 Wonsan Kalma Beach 원산 갈마 해변
 The Wŏnsan Operation, October 1950 - Korean War amphibious assault ordered by General Douglas MacArthur
 Google Earth images of Wŏnsan, including one of Kim Jong Il's palaces, a military airfield, and the ferry Mangyongbong-92
 nk.joins.com/map/view.asp?idx=i141.htm
 City profile of Wonsan 
 

 
Cities in Kangwon Province (North Korea)
Port cities and towns in North Korea
Resort towns